Michael or Mike Cole may refer to:

Sports
 Michael Cole (footballer, born 1937), English association football player
 Michael Cole (footballer, born 1966), English association football player
 Mike Cole (baseball), college baseball coach

Other
 Michael Cole (writer) (1933–2001), British writer and TV producer
 Michael Cole (psychologist) (born 1938), American psychologist and professor
 Michael Cole (public relations) (born 1943), former BBC journalist and spokesman for Mohamed Al-Fayed
 Michael Cole (actor) (born 1940), American actor
 Michael Cole (wrestling) (born 1968), ring name of WWE commentator and former journalist Sean Michael Coulthard
 Michael Cole (born 1974), real name of NWA wrestler Mikael Judas
 Mike Cole (politician) (born 1971/72), New York State politician
 Sir Michael Cole (politician), Irish politician
 Michael Cole (singer), Australian singer and actor

See also
 Michael Coles (disambiguation)
 Myke Cole (born 1973), writer of fantasy novels